Shields Warren (February 26, 1898 – July 1, 1980) was an American pathologist. He was among the first to study the pathology of radioactive fallout. Warren influenced and mentored Eleanor Josephine Macdonald, epidemiologist and cancer researcher.

Biography
He graduated with an A.B in 1918 from Boston University and with an M.D. in 1923 from Harvard Medical School. From 1923 to 1925 he was an assistant in pathology at Boston City Hospital and completed his medical residency there in 1927. At Harvard Medical School, he began teaching as an instructor in pathology in 1925, was promoted to assistant professor in 1936, and became a full professor of pathology in 1948. In 1927 he became a pathologist at New England Deaconess Hospital (which later became part of Beth Israel Deaconess Medical Center) and was promoted to pathologist-in-chief in 1946, serving in that post for 36 years. He also served as pathologist-in-chief at New England Baptist Hospital and at Pondville State Hospital and was a consultant for several other hospitals. He established New England Deaconess Hospital's Cancer Research Institute and served as the director of the Institute until he resigned from the directorship in 1968.

On August 11, 1923, he married Alice Springfield. They had two children.

Awards and honors
Shields Warren Festschrift
Member of the American Academy of Arts and Sciences
Ward Burdick Award for Distinguished Service to Clinical Pathology, American Society for Clinical Pathology, 1949
Banting Medal for Scientific Achievement Award, American Diabetes Association, 1953
Pathologist of the Year, Meritorious Service Award, College of American Pathologists, 1955
Albert Einstein Medal and Award, 1962
James Ewing Lecture, Society of Surgical Oncology, 1962
Member of the National Academy of Sciences, 1962
Member of the American Philosophical Society, 1963
American Cancer Society National Award, 1968
Enrico Fermi Award, US DOE, 1971
Holmes Lecture, New England Roentgen Ray Society, 1972
Gold Headed Cane Award, Association of Clinical Scientists, 1980

Endowed professorship
Shields Warren Mallinckrodt Professorship of Clinical Research, Deaconess Hospital and Harvard Medical School
Shields Warren Award, Boston University

Health Physics Society
Distinguished Scientific Achievement Award, 1974
Founders Award, 1985

Professional service
Trustee, American Board of Pathology, 1944–1958
American Society for Experimental Pathology
U.S. Atomic Energy Commission
U.S. Department of Defense
National Academy of Sciences
National Aeronautics and Space Administration
Veterans' Administration

Publications
Exposure Rates and Protective Measures against Radiation. Warren, Shields. (February 15, 1963). Exposure Rates and Protective Measures against Radiation. Proceedings of the American Philosophical Society. Vol. 107, No. 1: 18–20.

Textbooks
Collected Reprints. Shields Warren. (1921). Pathology.
 Sanitary Survey of Rochester, New Hampshire, 1922. Shields Warren. Harvard University Press, (1922). 114 pages.
The Sanitary Survey as an Instrument of Instruction in Medical Schools. Milton Joseph Rosenau, Shields Warren. (1924). 11 pages.
Medical Science for Everyday Use. Shields Warren. Lea & Febiger. (1927). 178 pages.
 Synopsis of the Practice of Preventive Medicine: As Applied in the Basic Medical Sciences and Clinical Instruction at the Harvard Medical School. Shields Warren, editor. Harvard University Press, (1929). . 396 pages.
Salivary Gland Tumors. Neil W. Swinton, Shields Warren. (1938).
Tumors of Dermal Appendages. Harvard University. Cancer Commission, Shields Warren, Olive Gates, Wesley N. Warvi. (1943). 79 pages.
A Handbook for the Diagnosis of Cancer of the Uterus: By Use of Vaginal Smears. Olive Gates, Dr. Shields Warren, George N. Papanicolaou. Harvard University Press. (1947). 182 pages.
Introduction to Neuropathology. Samuel Pendleton Hicks, Shields Warren. McGraw-Hill. (1950). 494 pages.
Atomic Bomb Injury—Radiation, Charles Little Dunham, Eugene P. Cronkite, George Veach Le Roy, Shields Warren. Atomic Bomb Casualty Commission. (1951). 13 pages.
The Cancer Problem. Volume 1 of Series on the early recognition of cancer. Shields Warren. American Cancer Society. (1954). 27 pages.
National Nuclear Energy Series. Manhattan Project Technical Section. Division 8 – Vol. 8: Medical Effects of the Atomic Bomb in Japan. Ashley W. Oughterson, Shields Warren. McGraw-Hill (1956). 477 pages.
The Pathology of Ionizing Radiation, 1961. Monograph in the Carl Vernon Weller lecture series. Shields Warren. The University of Michigan. (1961). 42 pages.
The Pathology of Diabetes Mellitus. Shields Warren, Philip Medford LeCompte, Merle A. Legg. The University of Michigan. (1966). 528 pages.
Tumors of the Thyroid Gland. Volume 4 of Atlas of tumor pathology: Second series. William A. Meissner, Shields Warren. Armed Forces Institute of Pathology. (1982). 135 pages.

References

1898 births
1980 deaths
American pathologists
American endocrinologists
Boston University alumni
Harvard Medical School alumni
Radiation health effects researchers
Health physicists
Health Physics Society
People from Cambridge, Massachusetts
Members of the American Philosophical Society